Virginia Beach City Public Schools is the branch of the government of the city of Virginia Beach, Virginia responsible for public K-12 education. Like all public school systems in the state, it is legally classified as a school division instead of a school district. Although Virginia school divisions perform the functions of school districts in other U.S. states, they have no taxing authority, instead relying on appropriations from their local governments.

The school system is the fourth largest in Virginia, and among the 50 largest school systems in the United States (based on student enrollment). All of the division's 80+ schools are fully accredited in the Virginia Standards of Learning (SOL).

Virginia Beach City Public Schools currently serves approximately 70,000 students, and includes nearly 90 schools.

The division has a fleet of nearly eight hundred school buses, which is serviced by two bus garages and is the second largest employer in the city, following Naval Air Station Oceana.

History
In 2004 the school board made plans to change the snack offerings and to establish a physical education class for 8th graders as a result of higher than desired obesity rates.

In 2004 there were plans to make significant changes to district attendance boundaries.

List of Schools

Elementary schools

Alanton Elementary School
Arrowhead Elementary School
Bayside Elementary School
Birdneck Elementary
Brookwood Elementary School
Centerville Elementary School
Christopher Farms Elementary School
Cooke Elementary
College Park Elementary School
Corporate Landing Elementary School
Creeds Elementary School
John B. Dey Elementary School
Diamond Springs Elementary School
Fairfield Elementary School
Glenwood Elementary
Green Run Elementary School
Hermitage Elementary School
Holland Elementary School
Indian Lakes Elementary School
Kempsville Elementary School
Kempsville Meadows Elementary School
King's Grant Elementary School
Kingston Elementary School
Landstown Elementary School
Linkhorn Park Elementary School
Luxford Elementary School
Lynnhaven Elementary School
Malibu Elementary School
New Castle Elementary School
Newtown Elementary School
North Landing Elementary School
Ocean Lakes Elementary School
Old Donation School (for students identified as gifted)
Parkway Elementary School
Pembroke Elementary School
Pembroke Meadows Elementary School 
Plaza Elementary School
Point O View Elementary School
Princess Anne Elementary School
Providence Elementary School
Red Mill Elementary School
Rosemont Elementary School
Rosemont Forest Elementary School
Salem Elementary School
Seatack Elementary School
Shelton Park Elementary School
Strawbridge Elementary School
Tallwood Elementary School
Thalia Elementary School
Throughgood Elementary School
Trantwood Elementary School
Three Oaks Elementary School
White Oaks Elementary School
Bettie F. Williams Elementary School
Windsor Oaks Elementary School
Windsor Woods Elementary School
Woodstock Elementary School
W. T. Cooke Elementary School

Middle schools

Bayside Middle School
Bayside 6th Grade Campus
Brandon Middle School
CEL (Center for Effective Learning)
Corporate Landing Middle School
Great Neck Middle School
Independence Middle School
Brickell Academy/ Old Donation School
Kempsville Middle School
Landstown Middle School
Larkspur Middle School
Lynnhaven Middle School
Plaza Middle School
Princess Anne Middle School
Renaissance Academy Middle
Salem Middle School
Virginia Beach Middle School

High schools

Bayside High School
First Colonial High School
Floyd E. Kellam High School
Frank W. Cox High School
Green Run High School
Kempsville High School
Landstown High School
Ocean Lakes High School
Princess Anne High School
Renaissance Academy
Salem High School
Tallwood High School

Former or repurposed school buildings

 Kemps Landing School, 525 Kempsville Road, has been remodeled into a residential apartment building.

References

External links
 VBCPS
 History of Union Kempsville High School, the first school for African Americans in Princess Anne County (video)

School divisions in Virginia
Education in Virginia Beach, Virginia
History of Virginia Beach, Virginia